Two ships of the United States Navy have been named Accentor, after the accentor, a bird most notably the hedge sparrow.

 , was a coastal minesweeper and the lead ship of the Accentor class.
 , was a large infantry landing craft that was converted into an underwater mine locator.

References

United States Navy ship names